Cacosis is a genus of flies in the family Stratiomyidae.

Species
Cacosis grandis Schiner, 1868
Cacosis niger (Wiedemann, 1819)
Cacosis sexannulata Meunier, 1910

References

Stratiomyidae
Brachycera genera
Taxa named by Francis Walker (entomologist)
Diptera of South America